James Agustin Greer (February 28, 1833 – January 17, 1904) was a rear admiral in the United States Navy, who served during the Civil War.

Early years
Greer was born in Cincinnati, Ohio. He enlisted into the Navy on January 10, 1848, shortly before his 15th birthday, joining the sloop  as a midshipman. He entered the United States Naval Academy in 1853, and graduated as a passed midshipman the following year. After participating in the Paraguay Expedition, he cruised the west African coast until the outbreak of the Civil War.

Civil War
This incident became celebrated as the Trent Affair.

In 1866 he was elected a companion of the Pennsylvania Commandery of the Military Order of the Loyal Legion of the United States (MOLLUS).  He was assigned MOLLUS insignia number 160.

Post-war service
After a tour of duty at the Naval Academy between 1869 and 1873, Greer returned to the Pacific Station. In 1873, he commanded the  when that ship was sent to find and aid the ship Polaris. The Polaris was wrecked on an Arctic expedition which had been led by Charles Francis Hall.

Greer was promoted to captain in 1876.

He held a variety of shore posts and was promoted to commodore in 1886 before serving as commander of the European Squadron from 1887 to 1889.

Greer served as president of the "Board of Organization, Tactics, and Drill", and of the "Examination and Retiring Board".

He was promoted to rear admiral in 1892, and retired on February 28, 1895. Admiral Greer died in Washington, D.C., and is buried in Arlington National Cemetery.

Namesakes
 The destroyer  was named for him.
 Several Tom Clancy novels feature a Vice Admiral James Greer, who is the Deputy Director of Central Intelligence.

References

 

1833 births
1904 deaths
Burials at Arlington National Cemetery
Military personnel from Cincinnati
People of Ohio in the American Civil War
Union Navy officers
United States Naval Academy alumni
United States Navy rear admirals